Peter Raymond Scholtes (1938–2009) was a priest, consultant, and author. In the 1960s, as a parish priest and choral conductor, Scholtes wrote the hymn "They'll Know We Are Christians by Our Love" for an ecumenical event.

By the 1980s, Scholtes had left the priesthood and become a business management consultant and author. He co-authored The Team Handbook, which was named one of The 100 Best Business Books of All Time. His best-known book is The Leader's Handbook, from 1998.

Scholtes was a colleague of W. Edwards Deming and was a recipient of the Deming Award in 2006.

References

External links
 http://pscholtes.com/obituary.htm
 https://pscholtes.com/

1938 births
2009 deaths
People from Evanston, Illinois
Writers from Illinois
20th-century American Roman Catholic priests